Peter Boag  is a professor of genetics at Queen's University. He specializes in molecular ecology. In 2001, he was elected as a Fellow of the Royal Society of Canada.

References

Living people
McGill University Faculty of Science alumni
Queen's University at Kingston alumni
Academic staff of Queen's University at Kingston
Fellows of the Royal Society of Canada
Year of birth missing (living people)